¡Mis abuelitas... nomás! ("My Grandmothers... Just!") is a 1961 Mexican film. It stars Sara García.

External links
 

1961 films
Mexican comedy films
1960s Spanish-language films
1960s Mexican films